American Bass Challenge, known in Japan and Europe as , is a fishing video game developed by Starfish for the Game Boy Advance. It was published in Japan by Starfish on August 8, 2001, and in North America by Ubisoft on December 5, 2001.  It is the eleventh game in the Black Bass series, though the Black Bass name was not used for the North American release.

Gameplay

American Bass Challenge has a few different modes: Practice, Quick Fish, and Tournament mode. The practice mode teaches the player the ropes like expected. The only major difference between Quick Fish and Tournament mode in the way it's played out, is that in Quick Fish, the player is provided a location and a lure, while in Tournament mode, the player must decide those aspects themselves. Quick Fish includes a system link feature, that allows up to four friends to play the game at once with only one cartridge.

American Bass Challenge, despite its look, is far from an arcade game, and has a more simulation feel to it. "American Bass Challenge actually takes the other route and delivers some heavier simulation gameplay." The game hearkens back to the NES fishing days, in particular, The Black Bass series.

Reception
The game garnered mostly positive reviews. GameSpot liked the depth of the game, but that the depth was also off-putting and its weakness, and gave the game a 6.1. IGN praised the game, and the reviewer wrote, "I never thought I would say this but, I found a fishing game that rocks." IGN gave the game an 8 out of 10. GameSpy writes that the game is an anomaly in the fishing game genre, because the user will most likely love the game. GameSpy gave the game a 68 out of 100.

References

2001 video games
Fishing video games
Game Boy Advance games
Game Boy Advance-only games
Multiplayer and single-player video games
Video games developed in Japan